Biomphalaria peregrina is a species of air-breathing freshwater snail, an aquatic pulmonate gastropod mollusk in the family Planorbidae, the ram's horn snails.

The shell of this species, like all planorbids is sinistral in coiling, but is carried upside down and thus appears to be dextral.

Distribution 
The distribution of this species is Neotropical and include: Peru, ...

Phylogeny 
A cladogram showing phylogenic relations of species in the genus Biomphalaria:

References

Further reading 
 

Biomphalaria
Gastropods described in 1835